Alluri Satyanarayana Raju was an Indian freedom fighter and politician. He belonged to Indian National Congress. He was a legislator and worked as a minister. Satyanarayana Raju was one of the signatories to the Gentlemen's agreement of Andhra Pradesh (1956), made for the merger of Andhra State with Hyderabad State (1948–56).

Satyanarayana Raju was a state minister in the Andhra Pradesh cabinet during the leadership of Neelam Sanjeeva Reddy and Damodaram Sanjeevaiah.

References

External links
 A blog on his Life

Indian National Congress politicians from Andhra Pradesh
Telugu politicians
Indian independence activists from Andhra Pradesh